DNOC may refer to:
Dinitro-ortho-cresol
Defence Network Operations Centre at HMAS Harman, Canberra